

Events

January 
 January 1
  – Elron takes over all domestic passenger train services in Estonia from Edelaraudtee.
  – Carl Ice assumes position as CEO of BNSF Railway, replacing the former CEO Matt Rose, who assumed position as Chief Operating Officer.
The sale, expected to close in mid-2014, includes the mainline from Tracy, Minnesota to Rapid City, South Dakota plus some branch lines.

March 
See: O'Hare station train crash
  March 27 – Opening of the Dulwich Hill extension of Sydney's Inner West Light Rail.

April 
  April 5 –  Opening of the Panama Metro in Panama City, Panama.
  April 28 – Auckland's first electric trains, the AM class, entered service on the Onehunga Branch. (See Auckland railway electrification.)
  April 29 – Changsha Metro Line 2 opens.

May 
 May 1
  – SunRail's commuter service in Greater Orlando, Florida, started service.
  – Opening of KLIA Ekspres KLIA2 extension line in Sepang.
  May 7 – Reopening of Saint Paul Union Depot in Minnesota to regularly scheduled train traffic. The depot last saw trains on 30 April 1971, the day before Amtrak began operation.
  May 9 – United States Department of Labor commemorates the contributions of Chinese railroad workers who helped build the railroad by adding them to the Labor Hall of Honor
  May 28 – The Wuhan Metro Line 1 Hankou North extension opens.

June 
  June 8 – Line 1 of the Mumbai Metro in India opens on the Versova–Ghatkopar west–east corridor.
  June 14 – Opening of the Green Line light rail service in Minneapolis–Saint Paul, Minnesota.

July 
  July 26 – The new WMATA Silver Line opens for passenger service in the Washington D.C. area. Construction of the Metro's 6th new rapid transit route included 11.8 miles of new trackway and 5 stations at McLean, Tysons Corner, Greensboro, Spring Hill and Wiehle – Reston East. Silver Line trains operate between Reston, VA and Largo Town Center Station on the Blue Line.

August 
  August 13 – A train of the Manila MRT Line 3 gets derailed at Taft Avenue station and overshot to the streets. The incident was caused by human error. 
  August 16 – Lhasa–Xigazê Railway opens to Xigazê Railway Station (Shigatse) in the Tibet Autonomous Region.

September 
  September 17 – Zhuyehai Station on Wuhan Metro's Line 1 opens.

November 
  November 10 – The Fulton Center New York City Subway interchange opened.
  November 22 – The Bay Area Rapid Transit Coliseum–Oakland International Airport line automated people mover begins service.
  November 23 – North South MRT Line 1 km extension opened, of which it is Marina South Pier MRT station.

December 
  December 25 – Indian Railways inaugurates the Sushasan Express, connecting Gwalior and Gonda, Uttar Pradesh, in commemoration of former Prime Minister Atal Bihari Vajpayee's 91st birthday.
  December 28 – West Island line opened.

References 

 
2010s in rail transport